This is the list of tourist attractions in Negeri Sembilan, Malaysia.

Galleries
 Tuanku Ja'afar Royal Gallery

Memorials
 Nilai Memorial Park

Museums
 Custom Museum

Nature
 Port Dickson

Sport centres
 Tuanku Abdul Rahman Stadium

See also
 List of tourist attractions in Malaysia

References

Tourism in Malaysia
Tourist attractions in Negeri Sembilan
Negeri Sembilan